Upper Talbotstown is a barony in County Wicklow, Republic of Ireland.

Etymology
Upper Talbotstown derives its name from  Talbotstown village, near Kilbride.

Location

Upper Talbotstown is located in west County Wicklow, covering much of the Glen of Imaal and the upper Slaney valley.

History
The Uí Máil were centred in Upper Talbotstown from the 7th century. The Ua Tuathail (O'Tooles) were driven here in the late 12th century. The original barony was split into lower and upper halves by 1801.

List of settlements

Below is a list of settlements in Upper Talbotstown:
Baltinglass
Kiltegan
Stratford-on-Slaney

References

Baronies of County Wicklow